Dick Edwards (June 21, 1930 – January 31, 1981) was an American basketball coach. He served as head basketball coach at the University of the Pacific in Stockton California, the University of California, Berkeley, and at Eastern Montana College—now known as Montana State University Billings—compiling a career college basketball coaching record of 304–182.  Edward was born on June 21, 1930 in Hannibal, Missouri.  He died on January 31, 1981, at the age of 50, after suffering an apparent heart attack in Billings, Montana.

Head coaching record

College

References

1930 births
1981 deaths
American men's basketball coaches
Basketball coaches from Missouri
California Golden Bears men's basketball coaches
Culver–Stockton College alumni
High school basketball coaches in the United States
Montana State Billings Yellowjackets men's basketball coaches
Pacific Tigers men's basketball coaches
People from Hannibal, Missouri